The year 2017 was marked, in science fiction, by the following events.

Events

 May 25 – 40th anniversary of Star Wars was celebrated by fans worldwide. The 2017 Star Wars Celebration convention in Orlando was dedicated to this date, and several anniversary collectibles were released.
 December 14 – Disney announced it would acquire 21st Century Fox for $52.4 billion. The deal includes rights for many science fiction franchises, such as Avatar, Alien, Futurama, Firefly, among others.

Deaths
 January 19 – Hilary Bailey, writer, critic and editor (The Fall of Frenchy Steiner, Frankenstein's Bride, Mrs Rochester, Fifty-First State)
 January 25 – John Hurt, English actor (Alien, Contact, Snowpiercer, Nineteen Eighty-Four, V for Vendetta)
 February 7 – Richard Hatch, American actor (Battlestar Galactica)
 February 10 – Edward Bryant, writer
 February 25 – Bill Paxton, American actor (The Terminator, Weird Science, Aliens, Predator 2, Edge of Tomorrow)
 March 22 – Daisuke Satō, writer (Highschool of the Dead, Imperial Guards, Seito, Red Sun Black Cross)
 March 26 – Marie Jakober, writer (The Mind Gods, The Black Chalice)
 April 5 – Huang Yi, writer (A Step into the Past)
 April 22 – William Hjortsberg, writer (Gray Matters, Legend)
 April 28 – Grania Davis, writer and editor (The Boss in the Wall, a.o.)
 June 9 – Adam West, American actor (Batman, Robinson Crusoe on Mars)
 July 15 – Martin Landau, American actor (Space: 1999)
 July 27 – H. A. Hargreaves, writer, professor
 August 3 – Jack Wodhams, writer (Ryn, Mostly Meantime)
 August 13 – Victor Pemberton, scriptwriter, television producer (Doctor Who)
 August 19 – Brian Aldiss, English writer (Super-Toys Last All Summer Long)
 August 31 – Richard Anderson, American actor (The Six Million Dollar Man, The Bionic Woman, Forbidden Planet)
 September 8 – Jerry Pournelle, writer, scientist, journalist
 September 10 – Len Wein, American comic book writer (Swamp Thing, Wolverine)
 September 15 – Harry Dean Stanton, American actor (Alien, Escape from New York, Repo Man, The Avengers)
 September 24 – Kit Reed, writer (The Attack of the Giant Baby, Thinner Than Thou, The Night Children, The Baby Merchant)
 October 9 – ElizaBeth Gilligan, author, former secretary for the Science Fiction Writers of America board of directors
 October 9 – Yoji Kondo aka. Eric Kotani, writer, editor and astrophysicist (Star Trek: Death of a Neutron Star, Requiem)
 October 17 – Julian May, writer (Saga of Pliocene Exile, Galactic Milieu Series)
 November 25 – Rance Howard, American actor (Independence Day, Cocoon, Mars Attacks!)

Literary releases
The Collapsing Empire by John Scalzi
The Delirium Brief by Charles Stross
Empire Games by Charles Stross
Forgotten Worlds, The Silence #2 by D. Nolan Clark
Martians Abroad by Carrie Vaughn
New York 2140 by Kim Stanley Robinson
Persepolis Rising by James S.A. Corey
Seek and Destroy, America Rising #2 by William C. Dietz
The Stone Sky, The Broken Earth #3 by N. K. Jemisin
Vanguard: The Genesis Fleet by Jack Campbell
Children of the Fleet by Orson Scott Card

Films

Original
 Attraction, by Fyodor Bondarchuk
 Battle of Memories, by Leste Chen
 Before We Vanish, by Kiyoshi Kurosawa
 Dance to Death, by Andrei Volgin
 Life, by Daniel Espinosa
 Orbita 9 by Hatem Khraiche
 OtherLife, by Ben C. Lucas
 Valerian and the City of a Thousand Planets, by Luc Besson

Sequels, spin-offs and remakes
 Alien Covenant, by Ridley Scott
 Blade Runner 2049, by Denis Villeneuve
 Ghost in the Shell, by Rupert Sanders
 Star Wars: The Last Jedi, by Rian Johnson
 War for the Planet of the Apes, by Matt Reeves

Television
12 Monkeys (season 3)
Adventure Time (seasons 9+10)
Agents of S.H.I.E.L.D. (season 5)
Big Hero 6: The Series
Colony (TV series) (season 2)
The Defenders
Dimension 404
The Expanse (season 2)
Extinct
The Flash (season 4)
The Gifted
Gotham (season 4)
The Handmaid's Tale
Home: Adventures with Tip & Oh (season 2)
I'm Not a Robot
Infini-T Force
Inhumans
Iron Fist
Kamen Rider Amazons Season 2
Kamen Rider Build
The Last Ship (season 4)
Legends of Tomorrow (season 3)
Legion
Marvel Super Hero Adventures
Miles from Tomorrowland (season 3)
The Orville
Philip K. Dick's Electric Dreams
Power Rangers Ninja Steel
The Punisher
Rick and Morty (season 3)
Runaways
Salvation
See You in Time
Sense8 (season 2)
Star Trek: Discovery
Star Wars Rebels (season 3)
Steven Universe (season 5)
Stitch & Ai
Supergirl (season 3)
Time After Time
Timeless
Travelers (season 2)
Uchu Sentai Kyuranger
Voltron: Legendary Defender (seasons 2–4)

Video games
Destiny 2
Endless Space 2
Horizon Zero Dawn
Mass Effect: Andromeda
Nier Automata
Prey
Star Wars: Battlefront II

Awards

Hugo Award

Best dramatic presentation (long form) – Arrival
Best dramatic presentation (short form) – The Expanse

Locus Award
Best Science Fiction Novel – Death's End by Liu Cixin

Saturn Award 

Best science fiction film: Rogue One: A Star Wars Story
Best Science Fiction Television Series: Westworld

Academy Award
 Arrival for Best Sound Editing.

Nobel Award for literature
Kazuo Ishiguro, author of 2005 science fiction novel Never Let Me Go.

References

See also

Science fiction by year
2017 in the arts